Allblk (typeset as ALLBLK in press materials but stylized allblk in its logotype; pronounced as "all-black"; Allwaysblk in Canada and the Caribbean), formerly Urban Movie Channel (UMC) is an over-the-top SVOD service operated by the AMC Networks. It was formed by Robert L. Johnson, the founder of Black Entertainment Television, in 2014.

The service features original movies and television series aimed at African American audiences, including live stand-up performances, documentaries and reality series, and stage plays.

On January 6, 2021, Urban Movie Channel relaunched as Allblk. The Canadian and Caribbean versions of the service remained under the UMC name until May 2022, when they rebranded as "Allwaysblk".

Original programming

Drama

Comedy

Unscripted

Docuseries

Reality

Variety

Stand-up comedy

Co-productions

Specials
These programs are one-time original events or supplementary content related to original TV shows.

Upcoming original programming

Drama

References

Notes

External links
 

African-American television
Subscription video on demand services
Internet properties established in 2015
AMC Networks